Bloukrans River may refer to any of the following rivers in South Africa:

Bloukrans River (Garden Route), which forms the border between the Western Cape and the Eastern Cape, near Plettenberg Bay
Bloukrans River (Grahamstown), tributary of the Kowie River, near Grahamstown in the Eastern Cape
Bloukrans River (KwaZulu-Natal), tributary of the Tugela River, near Frere in KwaZulu-Natal

See also 
 Bloukrans Pass (disambiguation)